Leslie Harris (c.1910 –1961)  was a motorcyclist in the 1950 Grand Prix motorcycle racing season. He was from Hull.

Harris suffered a fractured skull during a race in Germany in 1950. He retired in 1952.

Harris was killed in a car accident in Scotland in 1961, aged 51.

References

1961 deaths
English motorcycle racers
Year of birth uncertain